Pelli Choopulu is a 2016 Indian Telugu-language romantic comedy film written and directed by Tharun Bhascker and produced by Raj Kandukuri and Yash Rangineni. It features Vijay Deverakonda and Ritu Varma in the lead roles. Partly based on a real-life incident of "Spitfire BBQ" food truck, the film revolves around a boy and a girl who meet during match-making and how their aspirations bring them together forms the rest of the story.

The film was released worldwide on 29 July 2016 to positive reviews from critics and became a commercial success. The film provided breakthrough for the film's cast and crew. It is considered one of the "25 Greatest Telugu Films Of The Decade" by Film Companion.

The film won two National Film Awards for Best Telugu Film and Best Screenplay, two State Nandi Awards for Best Feature Film and Best Actress, and two Filmfare Awards South including Best Telugu Film. The film was remade in Hindi as Mitron (2018), in Malayalam as Vijay Superum Pournamiyum (2019) and in Tamil as Oh Manapenne! (2021).

Plot 
Prasanth goes to Chitra's house for a matchmaking event. He is a guy who completes his B.Tech by clearing many subjects for almost 5 years, but he is also lazy and incapable of doing any work. His dream is to become a chef and open a restaurant, but he doesn't get any support from his father. Chitra is a very focused girl who works hard to fulfil her dreams of going to Australia. However, her father shows no interest, as she is a girl. When both of them meet at the matchmaking event her younger cousin, Subhash, accidentally locks the door which jams very often and they get stuck eventually. To pass time, they talk about their past.

Chitra reveals that she was in love with a North Indian guy named Vikram. They both wanted to start a food truck business. Vikram went to Delhi to talk with his father about their love and business. Meanwhile, Chitra started her plan eagerly, and was ready to surprise Vikram by buying the truck. Then things went wrong and Vikram did not come back overpowered by greed of getting dowry. Chitra and her father waited for him but when they realised Vikram wasn't coming back, her father decided to get her married to someone else.

On his turn, Prasanth reveals that he was unemployed and always went out with his two friends. He, along with his friends, made cooking videos, as he is passionate about cooking. But it wasn't profitable enough so, they plan to make prank videos and were caught red-handed by Prashant's father, which ended their plan. He then got a job in a call centre after he was recommended by his father. He started going out with a girl to show off to his friends, but she cheated on him. He found out about it only when her second boyfriend called him at work, and quit his job after having a fight with his boss.

It is then revealed that Prasanth came to the wrong address for his matchmaking event. Later, Prasanth goes to his actual matchmaking event, which was with a rich family. Meanwhile, Chitra tells the guy coming to her matchmaking event that she's not interested in marriage. The family of Prasanth's bride wanted him to be able to run a business, so he and Chitra decide to operate the food truck themselves, with Prasanth as the chef, and Chitra in charge of the business side of things. At first, they face many difficulties, mainly through Prasanth's and his friends' laziness as well as fighting with Chitra and giving up the food truck.

Prasanth visits Chitra's house and informs her father that he should be proud to have such a responsible daughter. He also claims that if he ever gets a child he would wish to have daughter like Chitra and insists him that he let her pursue her dreams. Chitra understands the good nature of Prasanth and later convinces his father that he is a natural cook by cooking them Prasanth's recipe. They kickstart their business with the support from both their parents. After this, their food truck becomes a smashing success. In the process, they fall in love without realising it, but both of them are engaged to other people, so they drift apart. After realising they love each other, they come back together through a radio show organised by their friend, with the support of their family and friends.

Cast 

 Vijay Deverakonda as Prasanth
 Ritu Varma as Chitra
 Priyadarshi as Kaushik
 Abhay Bethiganti as Vishnu
 Nandu as Vikram
 Anish Kuruvilla as Businessman
Kedar Shankar as Prashant's Father
Khenisha Chandran as Richa
 Yogi Khathri as Event Manager
 Padmaja Lanka as sqtya, Prashanth's Mother
 Gururaj Manepalli as Chitra's Father
 Sujata Gosukonda as Chitra's Mother
 Anisha Alla as Prashanth's Ex-Girlfriend

Production

Development 
After making numerous short films, Tharun Bhascker made his directorial debut with this film. According to Tharun, Pelli Choopulu "is a very urban comedy set in a middle class in Hyderabad. It shows the contrast between the old and young generations and the comedy of errors that can happen within the space." Tharun had this basic idea of two contrasting personalities meeting for match-making, both getting stuck in a room is a metaphor for dating while food truck is a metaphor for live-in relationship.

Casting 
Ritu Verma who earlier worked in Tharun's Anukokunda was selected as lead actress while Vijay Deverakonda who portrayed a supporting role in Yevade Subramanyam (2015) made his debut as lead actor with this film. Vijay agreed to do this role as he found it "realistically very lazy" and "so close to my heart because young attitude, irresponsible behavior was a part of my personal life".

Filming 
Tharun shot the entire film in sync sound as he feels it offers freedom for artists to improvise their dialogues. The sync sound equipment from Mumbai, that was used for Gangs of Wasseypur was used for this film. The filming was completed within 35 days.

Distribution and Box-office 
The film was made on a budget of 60 lakh to 1.2 crore. The producer had spent another 60 lakh on its promotion. D. Suresh Babu acquired the theatrical rights for an amount of 1.50 crore and released it under his banner Suresh Productions across Andhra Pradesh and Telangana.

The film has collected over 5 crore gross at the AP/TG box office in its opening week. In five weeks, the film has grossed over 30 crore. The film's theatrical rights in the US had been bought for $200,000 and it went on to gross over $1.22 million, making it the biggest overseas hit in terms of return on investment.

Gemini TV has acquired its satellite rights for an amount of 2.35 crore.

Themes and influences 
Tharun followed character arcs from Knocked Up (directed by Judd Apatow). For the food truck business thread, Tharun revealed he drew inspirations from films like 100 foot journey and Chef.

Soundtrack 

This film has six songs composed by Vivek Sagar and lyrics are written by Rahul Ramakrishna, Shreshta, Shri, & Nikhil Bharadwaj. Music released on Madhura Audio.

Vivek Sagar earlier composed music for Tharun Bhascker's short film Sainma, he revealed that the film's music was conceived only after the film was shot. "With no lip sync songs, the music blended in with the narrative", he said.

Accolades

Remakes 
Pelli Choopulu was remade in Hindi as Mitron (2018), in Malayalam as Vijay Superum Pournamiyum (2019), and in Tamil as Oh Manapenne! (2021).

Notes

References

External links 
 

2010s Telugu-language films
2016 directorial debut films
2016 films
2016 romantic comedy films
Best Telugu Feature Film National Film Award winners
Cooking films
Films about chefs
Films about Indian weddings
Films about trucks
Films directed by Tharun Bhascker
Films shot in Telangana
Films whose writer won the Best Dialogue National Film Award
Indian romantic comedy films
Telugu films remade in other languages